Turcutheca is a Tommotian (Early Cambrian) genus of shelly fossil whose affinities are uncertain, generally considered as an orthothecid hyolith (which would make it a brachiopod, but also resembling the ellesmeroceratids (early cephalopods).

References 

Cambrian animals of Europe
Cambrian molluscs
Hyolitha